Notharctus tenebrosus was an early primate from the early Eocene, some 54–38 million years ago. Its fossil was found by Ferdinand V. Hayden in 1870 in southwestern Wyoming. When first found, Notharctus tenebrosus was thought to be a small pachyderm due to the concentration of pachyderm fossils in the area. However, after Walter W. Granger's discovery of a nearly complete skeleton, also in Wyoming, it was firmly established as a primate. Notharctus tenebrosus most resembles modern-day lemurs, although they are not directly related.

Notharctus tenebrosus belonged to an extinct primate group known as Adapiformes and fossils have been found in North America. Adapiform primates were among the first primates to exhibit a set of adaptations for life in the trees, such as grasping hands, binocular vision, and flexible backs. In addition to this, small orbits in the genera indicate that they were diurnal.

"Notharctus" means false bear, while "tenebrosus" means dark or gloomy.

Morphology

Notharctus tenebrosus had a fused mandibular symphysis and molar teeth with well-developed shearing crests, while the incisors are peg-like in form. Notharctus tenebrosus had canine teeth that are sexually dimorphic. The upper molars of this species have a pseudohypocone and the snout is moderately long, with a long premaxillary bone. Notharctus tenebrosus had a lacrimal bone that was positioned at the end of the orbit but not anterior to it. The vertebral formula of Notharctus tenebrosus is 7 cervicals, 12 thoracics, 8 lumbars, 3 sacrals, and 19+ caudals. Observing the fossils, Notharctus tenebrosus had long hindlimbs, trunk, and tail. On the hands and feet, the pollex and hallux are large and opposable, and the fingers and toes are long and possess nails, while on the foot the calcaneus is relatively short. There is evidence that the species had a type of grooming claw, thought to be an intermediate between a grooming claw and a nail. Notharctus tenebrosus has an average body mass of 4.2 kilograms and was about 40 cm long without its tail.

Diet and locomotion

Based on dental morphology, Notharctus tenebrosus most likely had a folivorous diet.

Based upon limb bone morphology Notharctus tenebrosus most likely moved by leaping and was an arboreal quadruped.

References

External links
https://www.webcitation.org/query?url=http://www.geocities.com/CapeCanaveral/Lab/8932/Adapidae.html&date=2009-10-25+06:39:48
https://web.archive.org/web/20080923123137/http://www.ansp.org/museum/leidy/paleo/notharctus.php
http://members.tripod.com/cacajao/notharctus_tenebrosus.html
Mikko's Phylogeny archive

Prehistoric strepsirrhines
Eocene primates
Prehistoric mammals of Europe
Prehistoric mammals of North America
Fossil taxa described in 1870